CUSA may refer to:

 Kues, town in Germany
 Nicholas of Cusa (1401–1464), German philosopher, theologian, jurist, and astronomer
 Carleton University Students' Association, Carleton University in Ottawa, Ontario, Canada
 Colleges and Universities Sports Association, a collegiate athletic conference in the Philippines
 Conference USA, a collegiate athletic conference in the United States
 Council of Unions of South Africa, a former South African trade union federation
 Canada and the United States; see